Gay Robot is  a comedy skit on Adam Sandler's fifth album, Shhh... Don't Tell.   In the sketch, a group of friends are watching football when the neighbor calls to let them know that his invention, Gay Robot, is coming over.   Gay Robot is very good with football statistics and is very horny because he does not know any other gay guys. The sketch consists of Gay Robot constantly trying to entice the others into sex with him.

Overview
As a comedy TV series, it was initially rejected until posted online, where it became a hit.   In 2005 Comedy Central ordered a pilot of Gay Robot as a live-action series from Sony Pictures TV and Adam Sandler and Jack Giarraputo's Happy Madison. In 2006, Comedy Central filmed a pilot for a TV show based on the comedy bit, which has never aired.  But clips posted online (first on MySpace) quickly racked up hundreds of thousands of views.  The robot, voiced by Nick Swardson, discovers he is gay after a wine cooler is spilled on him and fries his circuit board. According to the Hollywood Reporter, "The original pilot, in which Gay Robot and his fraternity buddies try to find him a date for the homecoming dance, was written by Swardson and Tom Gianas, who both executive produced with Sandler." TV Guide called the show a guilty pleasure and Gay Robot "the feyest droid since C-3PO". Inside the robot itself is actor Doug Jones. In an interview, he confirmed the insides of Gay Robot are based on Jon Lovitz's butler robot guy in The Benchwarmers, named Number 7. Although Jones is in the robot, it takes three people to maneuver Gay Robot. The robot suit costs $250,000. A feature-length Gay Robot movie has been worked up in an initial treatment, but is in limbo.

In 2007, the series was redeveloped as an animated project. The original run is composed of two eleven-minute stories per episode. According to the Comedy Central press release, "[T]he show follows the day-in-the-life adventures of Gay Robot and the guys partying their way through life while trying to find their way in the world." Gay Robot lives with his friends Nick, Pat and Matt after college. The character, voiced by Swardson, appeared in promos for Swardson's new series, Nick Swardson's Pretend Time, and appears in the show. In the premiere of Pretend Time Gay Robot is shown to be a bouncer/door ID-checker at a party where guest star Ryan Phillippe tries to enter, and Gay Robot makes passes at him.  In another episode he uses an iPhone Offender App, and as a newer, presumably young, robot he defends himself against a pedophile.

In 2011 Swardson revealed he had written a four-part mystery series, "Gay Robot and the Curse of the Haunted Jockstrap" for Gay Robot, but the network killed it after the script phase.

Other appearances
Posters were also seen in the movie Grandma's Boy. It was shown as a new video game.

In the Futurama episode "Proposition Infinity" Gay Robot can be seen in the crowd during Bender and Amy's speech, he can also be seen dancing at the robosexual parade.

Other gay robots
In Woody Allen's 1973 comedy Sleeper, character Jeb Hrmthmg, a futuristic gay man, has a gay robot as a house servant.

Chrome is a 1978 gay robot love story novel written by openly gay actor George Nader; it has become "somewhat of a queer cult novel".

Frank Zappa's 1979 rock opera, Joe's Garage, features a pair of gay robots in Act II by the names of Sy Borg and Gay Bob. Sy Borg ends up dying due to overly vigorous intercourse with Joe, the opera's protagonist.

In William Hoffman's 1985 play As Is, representing "the opening salvo in the theatrical war against AIDS", the character Saul turns into a "flamboyantly gay robot" as part of a chorus of characters presenting diverse views on the AIDS pandemic.

In 2011 a costumed and self-described gay robot protested then-candidate Michele Bachmann to support equal LGBT rights for gay humans and robots.   He had previously protested Bill Clinton in 2007 who was campaigning on behalf of his wife Hillary Clinton.

In April 2010 Geoff Peterson, a gay robot sidekick, first appeared on The Late Late Show with Craig Ferguson. It is voiced by Josh Robert Thompson, designed and built by Grant Imahara.

In 2011 filmmaker Mike Buonaiuto presented a fictitious gay robot available to consumers named Adam to raise "awareness of the importance of self-acceptance".

In 2011 Duke Nukem was revealed to have planned for a gay robot sidekick. Randy Pitchford, the "Gearbox boss", stated at a BAFTA event that "sexuality is part of the Duke personality", explaining that the original idea behind the sidekick was "to explore how Duke would relate to a peer that might have a different sexual orientation".

See also
 Gay bomb
 Gaydar
 Geoff Peterson

References

Fictional gay males
Fictional robots
Comedy sketches
Comedy television characters
Male characters in television
Fictional characters introduced in 2004
American football mass media
Adam Sandler
2000s in comedy